Magnus Fredriksen (born 24 May 1997) is a Norwegian handball player for HSG Wetzlar and the Norwegian national team.

He made his debut for the Norwegian national team in April 2018, and was selected for the extended squad for the 2019 World Men's Handball Championship.

References

External links
 
 
 
 

1997 births
Living people
Norwegian male handball players
Handball players at the 2020 Summer Olympics
Olympic handball players of Norway